Tim Hofstede (born 6 September 1989 in Breda) is a Dutch professional footballer who plays as a centre-back for Belgian amateur side Hoogstraten VV. Having started his career with NAC Breda, he spent six years with FC Den Bosch. He then moved to Belgium, joining KFC Zwarte Leeuw.

External links
 
 
 Voetbal International profile 

1989 births
Living people
Footballers from Breda
Dutch footballers
Association football central defenders
NAC Breda players
FC Den Bosch players
Eredivisie players
Eerste Divisie players
Hoogstraten VV players